Ruzhdi Ruzhdi (born 14 April 1991) is a Bulgarian Paralympian track and field athlete, competing in throwing events: javelin throw, shot put, and discus throw.

Personal history
Ruzhdi was born on 14 April 1991 in the small northeastern town of Glodzhevo, Bulgaria.  When he was 17, he survived a car crash, but was left paralysed from the waist down.

Athletics career
During balneotherapy rehabilitation in Pavel Banya, he met Daniela Todorova and her brother and trainer Radoslav Todorov, who recognised his sports talent.

Ruzhdi first represented Bulgaria on the world stage in London during the 2012 Summer Paralympics. He entered the shot put, javelin and discus throw, but did not medal in any of his events. The following year he travelled to Lyon to compete at the 2015 IPC Athletics World Championships. He entered the same three throwing events as in Beijing and again failed to reach the podium. Ruzhdi first major international success came at the 2014 IPC Athletics European Championships where he won the shot put in the F53/54/55 category with a throw of 11.48 metres.

In October 2015, Ruzhdi won the golden medal in shot put, category F55, at the 2015 IPC Athletics World Championships.

At the same championship, Ruzhdi won his third European golden medal with his result in shot put, which improved the previous world record held by Martin Němec.

References 

1991 births
Paralympic athletes of Bulgaria
Bulgarian male discus throwers
Bulgarian male javelin throwers
Bulgarian male shot putters
Athletes (track and field) at the 2012 Summer Paralympics
Athletes (track and field) at the 2016 Summer Paralympics
Athletes (track and field) at the 2020 Summer Paralympics
Paralympic gold medalists for Bulgaria
Paralympic silver medalists for Bulgaria
Living people
Medalists at the 2016 Summer Paralympics
Medalists at the 2020 Summer Paralympics
Bulgarian people of Turkish descent
Paralympic medalists in athletics (track and field)
People from Rousse Province
Wheelchair discus throwers
Wheelchair javelin throwers
Wheelchair shot putters
Paralympic discus throwers
Paralympic javelin throwers
Paralympic shot putters